Challis railway station (officially Challis Station) is a suburban railway station in Kelmscott, a suburb of Perth, Western Australia. The station opened on 29 October 1973, as did the adjacent Sherwood station, filling the large gap between Armadale station and Kelmscott station. It consists of two side platforms with a pedestrian level crossing. It is not fully accessible due to steep ramps and wide gaps at the pedestrian level crossing.

Services are operated by Transperth Train Operations, a division of the state government's Public Transport Authority. Peak services reach seven trains per hour in each direction, whilst off-peak services are four trains per hour. The station is one of the least used ones on the Transperth network, with just 259 boardings per day in October 2017. The City of Armadale rezoned nearby land in the 2010s with the goal of increasing patronage.

Description

Challis station is along the South Western Railway, which links Perth to Bunbury. The northern  of this railway, between Perth and Armadale, is used by Armadale line suburban rail services as part of the Transperth network. The line and the station are owned by the Public Transport Authority (PTA), an agency of the Government of Western Australia. Challis station is located between Kelmscott station to the north and Sherwood station to the south, within the suburb of Kelmscott, Western Australia. This places the station in Transperth fare zone three.

The only way to cross the tracks is at a pedestrian level crossing at the northern end of the station. Two car parks with 32 bays in total are on either side of the station, and there are bike racks as well. Challis station is not fully accessible due to the ramps to the platforms being too steep and the pedestrian crossing containing large gaps.

History
With the 1970 Corridor Plan for Perth, new areas between Armadale and Kelmscott were opened up for development. The Armadale–Kelmscott Shire Council began lobbying the state government for new stations within the large gap between Armadale and Kelmscott stations. Plans were completed by May 1973 for two new stations, with construction commencing soon afterwards. Originally planned to open on 20 October 1973, Challis station opened on 29 October, as did the adjacent Sherwood station (then known as Kingsley station). The shire council wanted the station to be named "Streich" after a well known local doctor, but the Western Australian Government Railways decided on "Challis", which came from the nearby Challis Primary School. The school was named after Challis Road, which was named after a family who had established an orchard in the area in the 1910s.

Shelters were added in 1982–83. The City of Armadale rezoned nearby land for higher densities in the late 2010s, with the goal of increasing patronage.

Services

Challis station is served by Armadale line services operated by Transperth Train Operations, a division of the PTA. The line goes between Perth station and Armadale station. Armadale line services reach seven trains per hour during peak, dropping to four trains per hour between peaks. At night, there are two trains per hour, dropping to one train per hour in the early hours of the morning. Apart from at night and on Sundays/public holidays, most train services follow the "C" stopping pattern, which skips Burswood, Victoria Park, Carlisle, Welshpool and Queens Park stations. There are also two "B" stopping pattern services which run during the afternoon Armadale-bound. Those services are the same as the "C" pattern except they stop at Queens Park. Starting at night, trains stop at all stations. On Sundays and public holidays, half of all trains are "C" pattern trains and half are all stops trains.

On Railway Avenue is a pair of bus stops for route 907, the rail replacement bus service.

In the 2013–14 financial year, Challis station had 73,805 boardings, making it the second least used station on the Armadale and Thornlie lines behind Seaforth station. On an average weekday in October 2017, the station had 259 boardings, making it the third least used Transperth station behind Seaforth station (136) and Success Hill station (139). The weekend average number of boardings was 209 in October 2018, the third lowest after Success Hill station (124) and Seaforth (170).

Notes

References

Armadale and Thornlie lines
Railway stations in Perth, Western Australia
Railway stations in Australia opened in 1973